Atle Jonas Hammer (11 March 1932 – 22 October 2017) was a Norwegian engineer and jazz musician (trumpet, Flugelhorn), central on the jazz scene in Oslo and known from several international cooperation.

Biography
Hammer, raised at Røa, Oslo, is the son of a civil engineer Eivind Hammer and grandchild of Hans Gudbrand Hammer. He was trained as a civil engineer in the United States, and later worked at Norwegian State Railways and Jernbaneverket.

He established himself as a leading trumpeter in Norway in the 1950s, and led his own sextet releasing the album Seven Eleven (1954), with Erik Amundsen (bass). He also played with Kjell Karlsen's Orchestra, The Norwegian Big Band, Mikkel Flagstad's Quintet, and performed on Egil Kapstad's «Syner», among others, and collaborated with such jazz musicians as Laila Dalseth, Pepper Adams, George Russell, Red Holloway, Bjarne Nerem and James Moody.

From 1980-85 he led his own quintet with among others Terje Venaas (bass), Eivin Sannes (piano) and Tom Olstad (drums), and this was followed by a quintet with Harald Bergersen (saxophone), Erling Aksdal (piano, 1985–89). During the 1980s and 1990s he played in bands with Thorgeir Stubø, Per Husby Quintet, Magni Wentzel Quintet, and in Big Bands like the one led by Harald Gundhus/Ole Jacob Hansen and Erling Wicklund's «Storeslem».

Later he has led his own quartet with Rune Nicolaysen (saxophone), Freddy Hoel Nilsen (piano), Carl Morten Iversen (bass) and as a quintet including with Lars Erik Norum (drums). He has also been a member of the ska band The Phantoms.

Honors 
1986: The Reenskaug Award
2010: Asker Jazz Clubs Honor Award

Discography 
Atle Hammer Sextett
1954: Seven Eleven
1992: Arizona Blue (Gemini Records), with Egil «Bop» Johansen, Egil Kapstad, Jon Gordon, Red Holloway and Terje Venaas

With Egil Kapstad Choir & Orchestra
1968: Norsk Jazzforum Presents: Syner - Egil Kapstad Choir & Orchestra - Live at the Munch Museum, Oslo

With The Norwegian Big Band conducted by Kjell Karlsen
1976: Day In, Night Out - The Norwegian Big Band

With Egil Monn Iversen's Big Band
1985: Live At Gildevangen (Camp Records), featuring Sylfest Strutle

With The Norwegian Radio Big Band
1988: The Norwegian Radio Big Band Meets Bob Florence (Odin Records)
1988: The Norwegian Radio Big Band Meets Bill Holman (Taurus Records)
With Harald Bergersen
1988: Joy Spring (Gemini Records)

References

External links 
Biography at Store Norske Leksikon
Biography at Jazzbasen
Discography at Jazzbasen

1932 births
2017 deaths
Norwegian civil engineers
Norwegian jazz composers
Norwegian jazz trumpeters
Male trumpeters
20th-century Norwegian trumpeters
21st-century Norwegian trumpeters
Musicians from Oslo
Ska musicians
Gemini Records artists
Male jazz composers
20th-century Norwegian male musicians
21st-century Norwegian male musicians